Thrill Seekers was a syndicated Four Star Television series that was produced in 1973 and 1974. It was hosted by Chuck Connors and featured people who did dangerous stunts. One of the series featured Australian stunt woman, Carol Cranston, who was working with the John Anderson Mustang Hell Drivers in the United States. Her episode of Thrill Seekers was shot at Terre Haute showgrounds, Indiana, where Cranston performed a high fall into cardboard boxes, did a hit and run at 30 mph, and was run over by a truck which drove over a plank placed across her midriff (see Cranston; also Crawford Productions). Another member of the Mustang Hell Drivers, Pat Jackson, performed in the series in which she jumped a pick-up truck from ramp to ramp.

External links
 

1973 American television series debuts
1974 American television series endings
1970s American reality television series
Television series by Four Star Television
Television series by 20th Century Fox Television